The 28/32 cm Nebelwerfer 41 (28/32 cm NbW 41) was a German multiple rocket launcher used in the Second World War. It served with units of the so-called Nebeltruppen, the German equivalent of the U.S. Army's Chemical Corps. The Nebeltruppen had responsibility for poison gas and smoke weapons that were used instead to deliver high-explosives during the war. The name "Nebelwerfer" is best translated as "Smoke Mortar". It saw service from 1941–45 in all theaters except Norway and the Balkans.

Description
The 28/32 cm NbW 41 was a six-barrelled rocket launcher mounted on a two-wheeled carriage. Two stabilizer arms and a spade under the towing ring served to steady the carriage while firing. It used two different rockets. The open metal frames of the launcher were sized to fit the  rocket, but adapter rails were provided to allow the  rockets to fit. The oil could cover  Both rockets were spin-stabilized and electrically-fired. They had a prominent exhaust trail that kicked up a lot of debris, so the crew had to seek shelter before firing. This meant that they were easily located and had to displace quickly to avoid counter-battery fire. The rockets were fired one at a time, in a timed ripple, but the launcher had no capability to fire single rockets. Many launchers were converted from 1943 to use the new 30 cm Wurfkörper 42 rockets as the 30 cm Nebelwerfer 42.

Schweres Wurfgerät 40/41

The 28 and 32 cm rockets could also be fired from their packing cases (Packkiste) which had short hinged legs to adjust elevation. They could also be mounted in groups of four on wooden (schwere Wurfgerät 40 – heavy missile device) or tubular metal (schwere Wurfgerät 41 (sWG 41)) launch frames. The external dimensions of the packing cases were identical so no adapter was needed for the smaller rockets. The packing cases could also be mounted on schwere Wurfrahmen 40 frames attached to the sides of Sd.Kfz. 251/1 half-track armored personnel carrier or various captured French tracked vehicles. The schwere Wurfrahmen 40 was nicknamed the Stuka-zu-Fuß (Stuka on foot).

SWG 40 in action
A sequence showing sWG 40 launchers being used against Warsaw, during the Warsaw Uprising in 1944.

Organization and use
The 28/32 cm NbW 41 was organized into batteries of six launchers with three batteries per battalion. These battalions were concentrated in independent Werfer-Regimenter and Brigaden. The rockets in their packing cases could be used by units ranging from mechanized infantry (Panzergrenadier) to engineers to positional rocket regiments (Stellungs-Werfer-Regimenter). The first units were organized after the Battle of France in 1940 and they saw service on the Eastern Front, Italian Campaign and the defense of France and Germany from 1940–45.

See also

Comparable 
 Katyusha rocket launcher
 Mattress (rocket)

Notes

References 

 Englemann, Joachim and Scheibert, Horst. Deutsche Artillerie 1934-1945: Eine Dokumentation in Text, Skizzen und Bildern: Ausrüstung, Gliderung, Ausbildung, Führung, Einsatz. Limburg/Lahn, Germany: C. A. Starke, 1974
 Gander, Terry and Chamberlain, Peter. Weapons of the Third Reich: An Encyclopedic Survey of All Small Arms, Artillery and Special Weapons of the German Land Forces 1939-1945. New York: Doubleday, 1979 
 Kameradschaft der ABC-Abwehr, Nebel- und Werfertruppen e.V. Die Nebel- und Werfertruppe (Regimentsbögen). 2001

External links 

 Lexikon der Wehrmacht on Nebelwerfers (in German)
 YouTube video of different kinds of Nebelwerfers in action
 Germany's Rocket and Recoilless Weapons from the U.S. Intelligence Bulletin, March 1945

Rocket artillery
World War II artillery of Germany
280 mm artillery
320 mm artillery
Weapons and ammunition introduced in 1941